Hathazari Government University College is a government-run, honors-level, degree college in Hathazari Upazila, Chittagong District, Bangladesh. It was founded in 1968.

In 2017, the Directorate of Secondary and Higher Education ordered that the college, which had been private, be nationalized.

The campus is located on the south side of the Chittagong-Rangamati Highway in Hathazari.

Total enrollment for the three divisions of the college is 3,375. As of 2017, the principal is Mir Kafil Uddin.

Notable alumni
 Prajnananda Mahathera

References

Colleges in Chittagong
Educational institutions established in 1968
1968 establishments in East Pakistan